It's My Pleasure is the tenth studio album by Billy Preston, released in June 1975 (July in the UK) on A&M Records. The album shows the modernisation of Preston's music, placing a heavier emphasis on synthesizers. It was also his first collaboration with the singer Syreeta Wright who sings on one track. The album is notable for featuring harmonica by Stevie Wonder on two tracks. George Harrison (credited as "Hari Georgeson") also appears, playing guitar on "That's Life".

"Song of Joy" would later be covered by Preston's A&M label mates Captain & Tennille for their album of the same name.

Track listing
All songs by Billy Preston, except where noted.

Side one − Program
 "Fancy Lady" (Preston, Syreeta Wright)  – 5:40
 "Found the Love"  – 3:58
 "That's Life"  – 3:36
 "Do It While You Can" (Preston, Bruce Fisher) – 6:42

Side two − Intermission
 "It's My Pleasure"  – 3:51
 "Song of Joy"  – 3:22
 "I Can't Stand It"  – 6:23
 "All of My Life" (Preston, Russ Rasputin)  – 5:52

Personnel 
Billy Preston – vocals, keyboards, piano
George Harrison – guitar (3, credited as "Hari Georgeson")
Tony Maiden – guitar (8)
Shuggie Otis – guitar (2, 4, 7)
Kenny Burke – bass guitar (8), guitar (5, 8)
Reggie McBride – bass guitar (2, 4, 7)
Stevie Wonder – harmonica (4, 5)
Syreeta Wright – vocals (1)
Ollie E. Brown – drums, percussion (1-5, 7, 8)
Rocky Dijon – congas (1)
Lorna Maxine Waters – backing vocals
Julia Waters – backing vocals
Luther Waters – backing vocals
Oren Waters – backing vocals
Malcolm Cecil, Robert Margouleff (TONTO: The Original New Timbral Orchestra) – synthesizers

Technical
Junie Osaki - art direction
Benno Friedman - photography

References

Billy Preston albums
1975 albums
A&M Records albums
Albums produced by Billy Preston
Albums produced by Malcolm Cecil
Albums produced by Robert Margouleff